David Boyd (born May 13, 1966) is a former professional rugby league footballer who played in the 1980s and 1990s. He played for the Canterbury Bulldogs from 1986–87, he was part of the inaugural Newcastle Knights squad from 1988–93 and then finished his career at the Western Reds from 1995-96.

Playing career
Boyd made his debut for Canterbury-Bankstown in Round 12, 1986. Boyd played in the club's 4-2 grand final loss against Parramatta, with his high tackle on Parramatta’s Ray Price resulting in a penalty goal for the Eels that proved to be their winning points. In 1988, Boyd joined Newcastle and was a foundation player of the club. Boyd played in the club's first ever game which ended in a 28-4 loss to Parramatta.

In 1993, Boyd signed with English club Halifax Blue Sox (Heritage No. 1054) and spent two seasons with them before returning to Australia in 1995 signing with newly admitted club the Western Reds.

Boyd played in the club's first-ever match, a 28-16 victory over St George, scoring a try in the game. Boyd played with the club until the end of 1996 before retiring.

References

External links
Bulldogs profile

1966 births
Living people
Australian rugby league players
Canterbury-Bankstown Bulldogs players
Halifax R.L.F.C. players
Hull F.C. players
Newcastle Knights players
Place of birth missing (living people)
Rugby league props
Rugby league second-rows
Western Reds players